Alhambra School District was a K-8 school district headquartered in the Scanlon Center in Alhambra, California, United States.

History
In January 1886, the citizens of Alhambra withdrew from the San Gabriel School District and formed the Alhambra School District. During the spring semester, classes were held in the second floor of a livery stable on a corner of what today would be 300 South Chapel Avenue.

On June 12, 1886, the Alhambra School District purchased the land for its first school from John and Ellen Conner for the price of “...one thousand (1,000) dollars gold coin...”. Garfield School opened its doors to students, grades 1–9, on September 15, 1886, and the first commencement was held June 14, 1889, with five pupils receiving diplomas.

The need for schools grew with the population, and the communities approved bonds to provide these schools. This and continued through the completion of Monterey Highlands School in 1965.

In 2004 it merged with the Alhambra High School District to form the Alhambra Unified School District.

References

External links

 (jointly with the Alhambra Union High School District, for dates prior to the 2004 merger)
Former school districts in California
School districts in Los Angeles County, California
Alhambra, California
School districts disestablished in 2004
2004 disestablishments in California
1886 establishments in California
School districts established in 1886